Walter Theodore Kostanski Jr. (December 10, 1923–June 15, 2015) was an American businessman and politician

Background
Kostanski was born in Erving, Massachusetts. He lived in Turners Falls, Massachusetts and went to the Turners Falls High School. Kostanski served in the United States Navy during World War II. He went to the Franklin & Marshall College and to the New England Institute of Funeral Directing Embalming. Kostanski lived in Turners Falls with his wife and family. He was a funeral director and was the owner of the Kostanski Funeral Home in Turners Falls. Kostanski served in the Massachusetts House of Representatives from 1957 to 1971 and was a Republican. He served as the Franklin County Register of Deeds from 1971 to 1995. Kostanski died at his home in Turners Falls.

Notes

External links

1923 births
2015 deaths
People from Franklin County, Massachusetts
Businesspeople from Massachusetts
Military personnel from Massachusetts
Franklin & Marshall College alumni
American funeral directors
Republican Party members of the Massachusetts House of Representatives
20th-century American businesspeople
United States Navy personnel of World War II